River Ridge High School may refer to:

River Ridge High School (Florida), in New Port Richey, Florida
River Ridge High School (Georgia), in Woodstock, Georgia
River Ridge High School (Illinois), in Hanover, Illinois
River Ridge High School (Washington), in Lacey, Washington, established in 1993
River Ridge High School (Wisconsin), in Patch Grove, Wisconsin

See also 

River Ridge (disambiguation)